The Central & Southern Gippsland Competition  is an Australian rules football league in the Latrobe Valley region of Victoria, Australia.

History
Following the proposed changes outlined in the AFL Gippsland Leagues and Competitions Review Draft Recommendations Report.
The recommendations for the Alberton Football Netball League and the Mid Gippsland Football League  to come together to form the Central and Southern Gippsland Competition. The clubs are set to compete in seniors, reserves, and under-17s. Both of those new entities will be administered and governed by AFL Gippsland.
The league was founded in 2019.

First games were played in 2021, as the previous season was cancelled because of the pandemic.  The 2021 season was shut down by order of the Victorian State Government.

The first completed season was in 2022, Yinnar won the premiership.

Clubs

List of premierships from previous country leagues.

2022 Ladder

References

Australian rules football competitions in Victoria (Australia)
Gippsland (region)